Schoch is a surname of German origin. The name refers to:
Knut Schoch, German tenor
Manuel Schoch (b. 1946), Swiss mystic and spiritual healer
Philipp Schoch (b. 1979), Swiss snowboarder
Robert M. Schoch, American geologist and pyramid theorist
Sally Schoch, American painter
Simon Schoch (b. 1978), Swiss snowboarder
Tim Schoch (b. 1949), American novelist and humorist

German-language surnames
Toponymic surnames